Makower is a surname. Notable people with the surname include:

 Alfred Makower (1876–1941), electrical engineer
 Helen Makower (1910–1998), British economist
 Joel Makower (born 1952), American entrepreneur and writer